Yaadhumagi Nindraai is a 2020 Indian Tamil-language film directed by choreographer and actress, Gayathri Raguram, who also plays the lead role. In the film, she plays Thamarai, a background dancer who aspires to become an actress. The film released on ZEE5 after much delay. This film marks the directorial debut of Raghuram.

Cast 
Gayathri Raguram as Thamarai
 Vasanth Kumar as Prasad 
 Sindhu Krishnan as Sophia
Nivas Adithan as Ganesh
 Latha Balakrishnan
 Abhishek Vinod

Release 
Cinema Express gave the film one-and-a-half out of five stars and wrote that " Despite the many issues that the film tries to address, what we get from all of this is only an outward display of the woman’s struggles and a voice that falls flat". Dinamalar gave the film a rating of two-and-half out of five.

References

External links 

2020s Tamil-language films
2020 directorial debut films
2020 films
ZEE5 original films
2020 direct-to-video films
Films scored by Achu Rajamani
2020 drama films
Indian drama films